Jamie Yeo (born 17 April 1977) is a Singaporean actress, model and radio DJ.

Early life
Yeo was born in Singapore on 17 April 1977. She attended Fairfield Methodist Primary School and Nanyang Girls' High School before moving to Dayton, Ohio for four years, where her father was posted as an engineer in the Republic of Singapore Air Force (RSAF).

She completed her secondary school education at Dayton Christian High School. After returning to Singapore, she entered Ngee Ann Polytechnic and studied mass communications, because her certificate from the United States was not recognised in Singapore so she could not take her A Level at a junior college. She eventually graduated from Ngee Ann Polytechnic in 1998.

Professional career
Yeo began as an actress portraying Tammy in the TV show Growing Up, arguably the role that made her famous. She has also acted in MediaCorp Ch8 Mandarin-language productions Holland V and Baby Boom in 2003.

Yeo left acting to pursue a radio career. From 2000 to 2006, she was a full-time DJ at MediaCorp Radio's 987FM.

In 2005, Jamie joined ESPN and became the face of shows like "Nokia Football Crazy" and "Football Extra." In 2009, "Football Crazy" was renamed "Castrol Football Crazy" due to a change in sponsorship and it went off air in 2010.

In an interview with TheSportsCampus.com in 2009, Jamie said her favorite football club is Arsenal F.C. and her favourite player Thierry Henry.

She is known for co-hosting the ESPN/Star Sports "Castrol Football Crazy" and "Maxis Football Extra" television shows in Asia.

In 2012, Yeo went back to radio with SAFRA Radio on the Singapore station Power98FM.

In 2015, Jamie returned to Mediacorp as radio DJ for Gold 905FM. In March 2016, she took over the drive-time show "The Homestretch".

Yeo is also the host of the travel and lifestyle program "Inside Singapore" on Insider TV.

Personal life
Yeo began dating Glenn Ong in 2001 and the couple married in New Creation Church three years later in 2004, but separated in early 2009.

In 2010, Yeo married Thorsten Nolte, a British immigrant in Singapore and the couple had a daughter. However, they divorced in February 2015. In April 2016, she gained sole custody of her daughter, Alysia.

In June 2017, she announced to the media that she was getting married for the third time to another British immigrant in Singapore, Rupert, and was five months pregnant with a baby boy. Their son, Luke, was born on 29 August 2017.

In November 2021, Yeo said that she's moving to Britain with her family in order to spend more time with Rupert's parents. Yeo moved to England with her family in July 2022.

References

Living people
Singaporean radio presenters
Singaporean actresses
Singaporean Charismatics
Singaporean female models
Singaporean people of Chinese descent
Ngee Ann Polytechnic alumni
1977 births
Singaporean women radio presenters